Nocardioides albidus is a Gram-positive, aerobic and non-motile bacterium from the genus Nocardioides which has been isolated from soil from Incheon, Korea.

References

External links
Type strain of Nocardioides albidus at BacDive -  the Bacterial Diversity Metadatabase

albidus
Bacteria described in 2016